is a Japanese footballer who plays as a midfielder for Thespakusatsu Gunma.

Career
Chie Edoojon Kawakami joined J2 League club Tokushima Vortis in 2017.

Club statistics
Updated to 22 February 2019.

References

External links
Profile at Kataller Toyama

1998 births
Living people
Association football people from Saitama Prefecture
Japanese footballers
Japanese people of Nigerian descent
Sportspeople of Nigerian descent
J2 League players
J3 League players
Tokushima Vortis players
Kataller Toyama players
SC Sagamihara players
Association football midfielders